Moosejaw.com is an online and brick and mortar retailer specializing in outdoor recreation apparel and gear for snowboarding, rock climbing, hiking, and camping. The company was founded in 1992 by Robert Wolfe and David Jaffe, two longtime friends who chose to sell camping equipment instead of becoming wilderness guides. Moosejaw is known for its nonsensical marketing called "Moosejaw Madness".

Parallel Investment Partners, a private equity firm based in Dallas, acquired a majority stake in Moosejaw in 2007 on undisclosed terms. Glencoe Capital, a private equity firm, acquired a stake in Moosejaw in 2009 on undisclosed terms. W Capital Partners, a private equity firm, acquired a stake in Moosejaw in 2013 on undisclosed terms. On February 15, 2017, retailer Walmart acquired Moosejaw for $51 million in cash. In February 2023, Dick's Sporting Goods agreed to buy Moosejaw from Walmart for an undisclosed amount.

Overview
Moosejaw.com was named a Top 50 retailer by Internet Retailer (2007), Top 50 retailer by Bizrate (2006), Best of the Web by Forbes magazine, and a Top 500 Retailer by Internet Retailer. Moosejaw has been recognized as a leader in online marketing by The New York Times, Outside magazine, and Chain Store Age magazine.

Moosejaw's official name, as it appears on their corporate charter, is Moosejaw Mountaineering and Backcountry Travel, Inc.. As of 2021, the company entered a period of slow, but consistent, expansion in the American retail store segment. At the time, the store had twelve locations which include eight in Michigan, one in Illinois, one in Colorado, one in Missouri, and one in Kansas.

According to its website history, the first store opened in 1992 in Keego Harbor, Michigan.  In November 2011, Moosejaw released an augmented reality app designed by Marxent Labs which allows shoppers to hold their mobile device over the Moosejaw catalog and view images of the models in their underwear. On September 1, 2012 Moosejaw Mountaineering opened a store in Kansas City, Missouri.  The new store is located in the Country Club Plaza; an upscale retail/dining district located south of downtown Kansas City. Moosejaw's annual revenue neared $100 million in 2014 and was growing roughly 25% per year at that time. Their newest store was opened in 2020 in Olathe, Kansas, and is associated with local rock climbing gym ROKC.  In 2021, they opened a new store in Bentonville, Arkansas.

See also
 Crowdrise

References

External links

Companies based in Oakland County, Michigan
Online retailers of the United States
Sporting goods retailers of the United States
Clothing retailers of the United States
Retail companies established in 1992
Internet properties established in 1992
Madison Heights, Michigan
1992 establishments in Michigan
Walmart
2017 mergers and acquisitions
Announced mergers and acquisitions